Stephan Keller (born 31 May 1979) is a Swiss football manager and a former player. Most recently he was the head coach of FC Aarau in the Swiss Challenge League.

Club career

Europe
Keller is a defender, born in Zürich, who played 13 years youth career for Grasshopper Club Zürich. He made his debut in professional football by being part of the Neuchâtel Xamax squad in the 1999–2000 season.

Keller spent the majority of his career playing for various clubs in the Swiss Super League before moving to Germany to play for 2. Bundesliga team Rot-Weiß Erfurt. After spending half a season there he moved to the Netherlands, where he spent four years playing in the Eredivisie playing for RKC Waalwijk and De Graafschap respectively.

Sydney FC
After four years in the Netherlands, Keller moved to Australia to play for Sydney FC in the A-League. On 26 July, he made his debut for Sydney FC in a friendly match against Newcastle Jets. He re-signed with Sydney FC for the 2010–11 A-League season. He scored his first goal for Sydney FC in the Round 5, 3–1 loss to Adelaide United at the Sydney Football Stadium. Following a poor second season and Champions League campaign from Sydney FC, Keller was released along with several other players.

Netherlands
Keller returned to Europe and sparked interest from former Eredivise club RKC Waalwijk. However, in a shock move Willem II signed Keller on a two-year contract, snatching him from under the nose of his former employee.

After being dropped to the reserves during the back half of the 2011–12 season, Keller and Willem II mutually terminated his contract with the club after he was told he was surplus to requirements, following the club's promotion to the Eredivise for the 2012–13 Eredivisie season.

Managerial career
Keller joined FC Aarau before the 2017–18 season as assistant manager to Ton Verkerk. He was caretaker manager following Verkerk's dismissal. Patrick Rahmen was installed as new manager the following season and Keller stayed with the club as his assistant. Keller was named the manager at FC Aarau on 10 July 2020 following the dismissal of Rahmen. His contract goes through 30 June 2023.

On 1 November 2022, after a six game winless streak in the league, he was dismissed from his position of head coach at Aarau.

Honours
Sydney FC
 A-League Premiership: 2009–10
 A-League Championship: 2009–10

References

1979 births
Living people
Footballers from Zürich
Swiss men's footballers
Association football central defenders
Switzerland international footballers
Switzerland under-21 international footballers
Neuchâtel Xamax FCS players
FC Zürich players
FC Aarau players
SC Kriens players
FC Rot-Weiß Erfurt players
RKC Waalwijk players
De Graafschap players
Swiss Super League players
Eredivisie players
2. Bundesliga players
Sydney FC players
Swiss football managers
Swiss Challenge League managers
FC Aarau managers
Swiss expatriate footballers
Swiss expatriate sportspeople in Germany
Expatriate footballers in Germany
Swiss expatriate sportspeople in the Netherlands
Expatriate footballers in the Netherlands
Swiss expatriate sportspeople in Australia
Expatriate soccer players in Australia